South Kensington is a 2001 Italian-British romantic comedy film directed by Carlo Vanzina and starring Elle Macpherson, Rupert Everett, Judith Godrèche and Sienna Miller, in her first screen role. It takes its name from the London neighbourhood of South Kensington.

Cast
Rupert Everett as Nick Brett
Elle Macpherson as Camilla Fox
Judith Godrèche as Susanna
Enrico Brignano as Francesco
Giampaolo Morelli as Antonio
Naike Rivelli as Ilaria
Jean-Claude Brialy as Ferdinando 
Sienna Miller as Sharon
Nunzia Schiano as Antonio's mother
Max Pisu as Massimo
Vic Tablian as Mobarack 
Eleonora Benfatto as Fabiana
Dado Coletti as Matteo

References

External links

2001 films
British romantic comedy films
2001 romantic comedy films
Films directed by Carlo Vanzina
2000s English-language films
2000s British films